WWM may refer to:

Walking with Monsters
What Was Missing
World Wide Media